Kuyavia, also referred to as Cuyavia, is a historical region in north-central Poland, situated on the left bank of Vistula, as well as east from Noteć River and Lake Gopło. It is divided into three traditional parts: north-western (with the capital in Bydgoszcz, ethnographically regarded often as non-Kuyavian), central (the capital in Inowrocław or Kruszwica), and south-eastern (the capital in Włocławek or Brześć Kujawski).

Etymology

The name Kuyavia first appeared in written sources in the 1136 Bull of Gniezno (Latin: Ex commisso nobis) issued by Pope Innocent II, and was then mentioned in many documents from medieval times. It is also mentioned in the chronicles of Wincenty Kadłubek.

Geography
In the north, Kuyavia borders with the historic regions of Gdańsk Pomerania (Pomerelia) and Chełmno Land, in the west with proper (exact) Greater Poland, in the south with Łęczyca Land and in the east with Masovia and Dobrzyń Land. The borders of Kuyavia stretch out on the left bank of Vistula River: from the mouth of Skrwa Lewa in the south-east, almost to the mouth of the Wda River to the north. The borders of Kuyavia spread out to the west from Koronowo and Nakło to the Noteć River where they turn south-west, cross Trląg Lake, and on to Strzelneński Forest, reaching Skulski Lake and the upper Noteć River. The borders also enclose Brdowski Lake, Przedecz and Lubień Kujawski through the Skrwa Lewa, ending at the Vistula River.

General description
The Kuyavian lowlands have an average elevation of 100–130 meters above sea level. It is post-glacial landscape, slightly undulating, in some places there are moraine hills and sandy gravel embankments. In deep dykes and depressions there are approximately 600 lakes larger than 1 km2. Under the glacial formations there are layers of rock-salt and potassium, and under Tertiary Period sediments there is lignite and ceramic clay. In Kuyavia there are black fertile soils, thanks to which Kuyavia is called “the granary of Poland”.

Capital and region

The episcopal see of Kuyavia was probably Kruszwica, and later Włocławek (after the episcopal see in the early 12th century). The capital of this Duchy, and - from the late 14th century - the residences of the Voivode governors were Inowrocław, Brześć Kujawski, and Radziejów as the seat of the shared regional Sejmik council of the two voivodeships. Today, the biggest center of Kuyavia is Bydgoszcz. Also the southern part of Toruń (Podgórz) lies in the historical region.

Some ethnographers and historians, for example Oskar Kolberg and Zygmunt Gloger, count the lands of Dobrzyń and Chełmno north-east of the Vistula as parts of the Kuyavia region.

History
The Linear Pottery culture existed in the area. The earliest solid evidence of cheese-making, dating to 5,500 BC, was found in Kuyavia.

Middle Ages

The beginnings of the state in Kuyavia are connected with the tribal state of the West Slavic Goplans. The Goplans, which some researchers identify with the Mazowszanie-Kłobianie or simply with the Kuyavians, had created a country with the main centers in Kruszwica on the northern shore of Lake Gopło. During the 10th century, their territory was conquered by another West Slavic tribe, the Polans settling in the adjacent Greater Polish land around Poznań and Gniezno and upon the death of Duke Mieszko I of Poland in 992, the Kuyavia lands were part of the early Duchy of Poland, mentioned as Civitas Schinesghe as circumscribed in the Dagome iudex papal regesta.

According to Andrzej Bańkowski, the Polans had moved into the region of Greater Poland after they had to leave together with the Morawianie, their former Pannonian territories, conquered by the Avars. According to some sources, during the war with the Goplans, the Polans were supported by a Great Moravian army. As a result of occupation of the Goplans’ territory, the lands of Kuyavia were under the strong influence of the Pannonian culture and they lost their primary Masovian spirit.

When the name Cuiavia arose for the first time in the 1136 Bull of Gniezno, it referred to the lands east of Greater Poland around Kruszwica and Włocławek, bordering with the Vistula river. The bull confirmed the position of the Bishopric of Kuyavia at Włocławek as a suffragan diocese of the Archdiocese of Gniezno.

In the times of the Polish fragmentation upon the 1138 Testament of Bolesław III Krzywousty, Kuyavia at first became part of the Duchy of Masovia under Bolesław IV the Curly and his son Leszek; it was claimed by the Polish High Duke Casimir II the Just in 1186, contested by his elder brother Mieszko III the Old and his son Bolesław. Casimir's son Duke Konrad I of Masovia in 1233 created the Duchy of Kuyavia for his second son Casimir I. When Casimir's elder brother Duke Bolesław I of Masovia died in 1248, he took the occasion and took Dobrzyń Land east of the Vistula River from the heritage of his younger brother Siemowit I. Upon Casimir's death 1267, the Duchy of Kuyavia was divided by his sons Leszek II the Black (d. 1288), Ziemomysł (d. 1287) and Władysław I the Elbow-high into the two separate duchies of Inowrocław and Brześć Kujawski.

In 1306 Ziemomysł's son Casimir II swore allegiance to his uncle Władysław I, who began to re-unite the Lands of the Polish Crown under his rule. The duchy was devastated during the Polish–Teutonic War of 1326–32, culminating in the 1331 Battle of Płowce, but was finally restored to Poland by the Teutonic Knights in the 1343 Treaty of Kalisz. With the death of Casimir's son Władysław the White in 1388, the Kuyavian line of the Piast dynasty became extinct. After the reunification of Polish lands in the 14th century, the division into provinces and counties was introduced. That division finalized in the 15th century, existed until the dissolution of the Polish–Lithuanian Commonwealth in 1795. Kuyavia was divided into the two administrative divisions of Brześć Kujawski Voivodeship and Inowrocław Voivodeship. The Brześć Kujawski Voivodeship was further divided into five powiats (counties): Brześć, Kowal, Kruszwica, Przedecz and Radziejów, while the Inowrocław Voivodeship was divided into the Bydgoszcz and Inowrocław powiats and Dobrzyń Land east of the Vistula. Both voivodeships formed part of the larger Greater Poland Province of the Kingdom of Poland and the Polish–Lithuanian Commonwealth. The Battle of Koronowo of the Polish–Lithuanian–Teutonic War was fought in the region on 10 October 1410, and ended in a Polish victory.

Partitions of Poland
As a result of the First Partition of Poland in 1772 the Kingdom of Prussia took a considerable part of Inowrocław Voivodeship and the western part of Brześć Kujawski Voivodeship, and included it within its newly formed Netze District. After the Second Partition of 1793 the whole of Kuyavia was taken by Prussia and incorporated into the newly formed province of South Prussia. Upon the 1807 Treaties of Tilsit, it was part of the Napoleonic Duchy of Warsaw and administrated within the Bydgoszcz Department.

In 1815 under the provisions of the Congress of Vienna, Kuyavia was divided between the Kingdom of Poland (Congress Poland remaining in a personal union with the Russian Empire) and the Kingdom of Prussia. While the Brześć Kujawski province (counties: Aleksandrów, Radziejów and Włocławek) remained with the Masovia Governorate of Congress Poland, Inowrocław (Hohensalza) was incorporated into the Prussian Grand Duchy of Posen. The Polish population resisted anti-Polish policies, which included forced Germanisation and Russification, and took part in several uprisings incl. the Greater Poland uprising of 1848 and January Uprising of 1863–1864. That division outlasted the 1871 unification of Germany until the end of World War I.

Republic of Poland
Following World War I, Poland regained independence and control of the region. Within the Second Polish Republic, from 1918, the western part of Kuyavia belonged to Poznań Voivodeship, and the eastern part belonged to the Warsaw Voivodeship. In 1938 almost all Kuyavia became a part of Pomeranian Voivodeship. In 1934 the Muzeum Nadgoplańskie in Kruszwica was built. It was opened in 1939, and it had valuable collection of ethnographical objects, inter alia: furniture and clothing.

Following the joint German-Soviet invasion of Poland, which started World War II in September 1939, it was occupied by Nazi Germany. During the occupation, almost all of Kuyavia was annexed into the newly formed province of Reichsgau Wartheland, except the northwestern part with the city of Bydgoszcz that was annexed to the newly formed province of Reichsgau Danzig-West Prussia. The Polish population was subjected to various crimes, such as mass arrests, imprisonment, slave labor, expulsions, kidnapping of children, deportations to Nazi concentration camps and extermination, incl. the Intelligenzaktion. Major sites of massacres of Poles in the region included Gniewkowo, Fordon, Otorowo, Buszkowo, Tryszczyn, Odolion and Borówno. The Germans also operated subcamps of the Potulice and Stutthof concentration camps in Bydgoszcz, and the large Stalag XX-A prisoner-of-war camp for Polish, British, French, Australian and Soviet POWs in southern Toruń. In 1945, the German occupation ended and the region was restored to Poland.

In the years 1945-1975 Kuyavia was in the borders of Bydgoszcz Voivodeship. The Włocławek Voivodeship was created in 1975, and the western part of Kuyavia remained in the Bydgoszcz Voivodeship. In 1999 almost the whole of Kuyavia was joined to the Kuyavian-Pomeranian Voivodeship. Furthermore, small parts of the region were included in the borders of the Masovian Voivodeship (regions between the border of the province and Skrwa Lewa River) and Greater Poland Voivodeship (Przedecz, Wierzbinek).

Main cities and towns

Sports
The most successful and popular sports clubs in the region include motorcycle speedway team Polonia Bydgoszcz, basketball teams Anwil Włocławek, Astoria Bydgoszcz (men) and Basket 25 Bydgoszcz (women) and volleyball teams Chemik Bydgoszcz (men) and Pałac Bydgoszcz (women).

Gallery

See also
 Duchy of Greater Poland
 Duchy of Masovia
 History of Poland during the Piast dynasty

References

External links 
 Website of Kujawy-Pomeranian Voivodeship (in English)

Regions of Poland